Hosta virus X (HVX) is a virus that infects Hostas. The disease was first identified in 1996 by Dr. Benham Lockhart at the University of Minnesota, and grouped with the Potato X (potex) viruses. The virus has reached epidemic proportions and can be found in many garden centers and nurseries around the globe.

Emergence 
Hosta virus X began showing up in nurseries in the early 2000's.  At first some people bought the infected hostas, believing that they were new cultivars of the plant.  Hosta cultivars such as "Break Dance," "Eternal Father," "Leopard Frog," "Blue Freckles," and "Lunacy" were not actual new cultivars, but instead were Hostas infected with Hosta virus X that were mistakenly believed to be new cultivars.  Some of the infected hostas also made their way into European growers.

Eventually, the virus reached the large growers in the Netherlands, and caused the virus to spread quickly.

Signs and symptoms 
Hosta virus X does not kill the plants infected, but hostas that have been infected do show a variety of other symptoms, such as:

 Ink-bleed, which makes the plant look discolored in certain spots, and this effect is generally centered on a vein.  An example of this is shown in the photo in this article.
 Collapsed tissue, which can be signs of heavier infection, makes the leaf tissue look flattened and empty.
 Mottling, which makes the plant appear blotchy.  This is not always a symptom of HVX, and could be from another virus, but it should always be treated as a virus infected plant regardless.
A hosta may no longer express symptoms of the virus when it grows back in the Spring, even though it may have shown symptoms in a previous year. Nonetheless, the plant should still be considered infected with HVX.

A hosta infected with the virus may be asymptomatic.  Some plants in a study conducted by Dr. Lockhart at The University of Minnesota did not show symptoms for up to 3 years after testing positive for the virus.

Control 
Once a hosta plant is infected, it will be infected for the rest of its life. Any plant suspected of being infected should be burned if it is legal to do so.  If it is not, then it should be tossed in the garbage, but infected hosta plants should never be composted. If any plant in a batch shows symptoms, the entire batch should be considered infected and be destroyed. Once a plant has been removed, the spot occupied by the hosta should be left empty for a long time to prevent the spread of the virus to a plant that replaces it.

The virus primarily spreads through infected sap, so dividing or cutting multiple plants with hands or the same tool can spread the virus. Handling the roots also spreads it easily. Animals that eat the plants may also spread the virus through sap by eating from an infected plant and then eating from an uninfected plant, though this has not been proven. Other as yet unidentified vectors may exist. 

People who wish to buy hostas may request proof from the seller that the Hosta is HVX-free before purchase.  After purchase, even if test results come back negative for HVX, suspect hostas should be quarantined for a year or more away from other hostas and be observed to see if they present any symptoms.

Virus structure 
The virus is about 530nm in length, and has a weight of 27 kDa. The virus shape is filamentous.

References 

Potexviruses
Ornamental plant pathogens and diseases
Viral plant pathogens and diseases